The 4th Guam Legislature was a meeting of the Guam Legislature. It convened in Hagatna, Guam on January 7, 1957 and ended on January 5, 1959.

The 4th Guam Legislature was elected in the 1956 Guamanian legislative election.

Membership

References 

Politics of Guam
Political organizations based in Guam
Legislature of Guam